"" is the national anthem of Bangladesh. An ode to Mother Bengal, the lyrics were written by Bengali polymath Rabindranath Tagore in 1905, while the melody of the hymn was adopted from the Baul singer Gagan Harkara's song "Ami Kothay Pabo Tare" set to Dadra Tala. The modern instrumental rendition was arranged by Bangladeshi musician Samar Das.

Etymology
The word  literally means "made of gold", with  meaning gold, and  showing possession. It is used as a term of endearment meaning "beloved", but in the song the words  may be interpreted to express the preciousness of Bengal.

History 

The song was written in 1905 during the first partition of Bengal, when the ruling British Empire had an undivided province of Bengal Presidency split into two parts; the decision was announced on 20 July by the then-Viceroy of India Lord Curzon, taking effect on 16 October. This divide of Bengal, being along communal lines–East Bengal and Assam having a majority of Muslims and West Bengal having a majority of Hindus–is claimed to have undermined India's national movement against the UK's imperialism and to have been politically motivated. Along with a host of others, songs such as this were meant to rekindle the unified spirit of Bengal, to raise public consciousness against the communal political divide. The lyrics first appeared in the September issues of Bongodorshon and Baul simultaneously, in 1905. Indira Devi, Tagore's niece, Satyendranath Tagore's daughter, jotted down the musical notation hearing it from Tagore himself (this was the common norm, Tagore singing the song, and someone formally jotting down the musical notations).

Official adaption 
The first ten (10) lines of this song constitute Bangladesh's national anthem, adopted in 1971 during its liberation war. Only those lines are given in the following section. The instrumental orchestra rendition was composed by Samar Das.

Lyrics

Original poem 
The following provides the lyrics of the "" as written by Rabindranath Tagore. Only the first ten lines of this song currently constitute Bangladesh's national anthem.

Lyrics as sung 
The following are the lyrics of the national anthem as sung, which differ slightly from the original poem.

Notable performances and covers 
The Ministry of Cultural Affairs planned to stage an event on Bangladesh's 44th independence day, in a bid to have the world record of the most people singing a national anthem simultaneously. Consequently, on 2 March, the ministry launched a program titled "Lakho Konthe Sonar Bangla" whose main objective was to hold an event with the cooperation of Bangladesh Armed Forces where approximately 300,000 people would sing the national anthem. Several popular Bangladeshi musicians and cultural groups later joined the program.

The record was broken at 11:20 on 26 March 2014 by 254,537 participants at Dhaka's National Parade Ground. The event was attended by the Prime Minister of Bangladesh, Speaker of the Jatiya Sangsad, and all the members of the cabinet. After receiving the required evidence, the Guinness Book of World Records approved the record on 9 April 2014. The record was broken by India on 21 January 2017.

See also 

 Notuner Gaan, the national march of Bangladesh, written by Kazi Nazrul Islam.
 Ekusher Gaan, a song in the memory of the martyrs of the Bengali language movement
 Jana Gana Mana, national anthem of India, also written by Rabindranath Tagore
 Banga Mata
 Joy Bangla

Notes

References

External links 

Bangladeshi songs
Songs written by Rabindranath Tagore
Asian anthems
Bengali-language songs
Bengali-language poems
Bangladeshi patriotic songs
National anthem compositions in A-flat major
Poems by Rabindranath Tagore
Rabindra Sangeet